Superplan was a high-level programming language developed between 1949 and 1951 by Heinz Rutishauser, the name being a reference to "Rechenplan" (i.e. computation plan), in Konrad Zuse's terminology designating a single Plankalkül program.

The language was described in Rutishauser's 1951 publication Über automatische Rechenplanfertigung bei programmgesteuerten Rechenmaschinen (i.e. Automatically created Computation Plans for Program-Controlled Computing Machines).

Superplan introduced the keyword  (Germany) as for loop, which had the following form ( being an array item):

 Für i=base(increment)limit:  + addend =

See also 
 Compiler

References

Further reading 
 
   (77 pages)

Programming languages created in 1949
Procedural programming languages
Non-English-based programming languages
Swiss inventions
Heinz Rutishauser
Konrad Zuse
1940s establishments in Switzerland